Lloyd C. Winter, better known as Bud (June 8, 1909 – December 6, 1985) was an American track and field coach who is regarded as one of the greatest sprint coaches in the world.  Over a 29-year coaching career (1941–1970) at the then San Jose State College, he produced 102 All-Americans, 27 who went on to become Olympians.

Included in the list of successes were Olympic gold medalists Lee Evans, Tommie Smith and Ronnie Ray Smith.  All the aforementioned also became World Record Holders, Evans' 1968 record in the 400 meters lasted almost 20 years—the first man to break 44 seconds, Smith's World Record in the 200 meters lasted over a decade—the first man to officially break 20 seconds.  Winter also coached John Carlos, who can also lay claim to being the first man to break 20 seconds in the 200 meters (though his record was disallowed because of the "brush" type of spikes he used) and Christos Papanikolaou of Greece, who was the first man to clear 18 feet in the pole vault.   As a team, San Jose State won the 1969 National Collegiate Athletic Association (NCAA) Div I Track Championships; his teams placed in the top 10 14 times.  San Jose State also won two NCAA Men's Division I Cross Country Championships in 1962 and 1963 and were runners-up in 1961.  Winter served as an assistant coach for the U.S. team at the 1964 Olympic Games in Tokyo.

Early success

Before joining SJSC, Winter coached Harold Davis at Hartnell College in Salinas, California to tying the world record in the 100 metres. Davis never had the opportunity to compete in the Olympics, his peak years falling during World War II. During the war, Winter taught relaxation techniques to Naval pilots. Also during that time, Winter invented a life jacket that would automatically inflate if it came in contact with water.  It was those same relaxation techniques taught to sprinters that "allowed the speed to come out."

At SJSC, Winter's first success was Willie Steele, who went on to win the 1948 Olympic gold medal in the long jump.  Winter's next success was with Ray Norton, previously from Oakland City College, bringing him to be the No. 1 sprinter in the world and tying the world record in the 100 metres. California State Junior College sprint champion Bob “The Bullet” Poynter (later coach to Millard Hampton and Andre Phillips at Silver Creek High School) to give SJSC the top two sprinters in the world.

Also working with Winter as an assistant coach was Bert Bonanno, who went on to coach across town at San Jose City College. Bonanno later coached many of the athletes involved the 1970s resurgence of San Jose as a Track and Field hotbed, including Olympic medalists Hampton, Phillips, John Powell and Bruce Jenner (later to be known as Caitlyn Jenner).

Speed City
The track stadium at San Jose State University is named "Bud" Winter Field.  While he was coaching, such was his success, it was known as "Speed City."  Since his departure, to the embarrassment of Winter's legacy, San Jose State closed down its track program in the wake of Title IX.  The stadium has fallen into disrepair.  The famed Tartan track, which Winter caused to be one of the first such tracks in the world, is used as a parking lot for the neighboring Spartan Stadium.  The site is now proposed to become a football/soccer stadium.

In August 2016, San Jose State University announcement the reinstatement of men's track and field, with the official program restart date of October 16, 2018 on the 50th anniversary of Tommie Smith and John Carlos demonstration on the Olympic Games podium

Author
Winter authored the book "So You Want to be a Sprinter," still one of the leading works on the subject of sprinting.
There is also a video by the same name  "So You Want to be a Sprinter". He wrote four books in total:

 So You Want to be a Sprinter (1956, 1973) with Jimson Lee
 The Rocket Sprint Start (1964) with Jimson Lee
 Jet Sprint Relay Pass (June 1, 1964, Tafnews Press)
 Relax and Win: Championship Performance in Whatever You Do (December 1, 1981, Oak Tree Publications).

Death
Winter died of a heart attack in Houston at the age of 76 after playing a game of Racquetball with Bonanno, one day before his induction into the National Track and Field Hall of Fame.  In 2010 he was inducted into the African-American Ethnic Sports Hall of Fame

Athletes coached by Winter
 John Carlos 1 Olympic medal, world record 200 meters
 Harold Davis world record 100 meters
 Lee Evans 2 Olympic Gold medals, world record 400 meters
 Jeff Fishback
 Dennis Johnson, brought sprint technique coaching to Jamaica
 George Mattos
 Lloyd Murad
 Ray Norton = world record 100-yard dash, = world record 100 meters
 Jimmy Omagbemi
 Christos Papanikolaou world record holder pole vault, first man over 18'
 Bobby Poynter
 Ronnie Ray Smith 1 Olympic Gold medal, = world record 100 meters
 Tommie Smith 1 Olympic Gold medal, world record 200 meters
 Dick Smothers
 Willie Steele 1 Olympic Gold medal
 Willie Williams world record 100 meters

Notes

References

1909 births
1985 deaths
American track and field coaches
College track and field coaches in the United States
San Jose State Spartans coaches
Sportspeople from San Jose, California
Sports coaches from California
Track and field people from California